Eaismo (atomic era-ism) was a 20th-century avant-garde movement born in Italy in 1948, founded by the painter, Voltolino Fontani, who was the main representative of it, with the poet Marcello Landi, the literary critic Guido Favati and the painters Angelo Sirio Pellegrini and Aldo Neri.

It was also the Italian writer Carlo Cassola, to talk about Eaismo by writing some articles for the magazine "Il Mondo".

The Manifesto of Eaismo, signed also by the painters Angelo Sirio Pellegrini and Aldo Neri, highlighted the pessimism and the optimism of the Atomic age, but was skeptical about the supposed revolutionary power of  atomic energy.

The Manifesto of Eaismo, published in 1948, was followed by the Manifesto pittura nucleare by Enrico Baj (1951),  and by the Mystical Manifesto, written by Salvador Dalí (1951).

References

  5 Riccardo Rossi Menicagli, Eaismo 1948 e Post Eaismo 2018, sottotitolo: Arte dell'Era Atomica e Arte dell'Era Post Atomica, Kindle Direct Publishing del 22 dicembre 2018.

External links
:it:Pittura Nucleare The Italian page for the arte nucleare
:it:Era atomica The Italian page for the atomic age
 Haaretz, link read in 2015 
 Aftenposten innsikt,link read in 2015
 China Times,link read in 2015

Italian art movements
Modern art